Maslarov Nunatak is the rocky ridge 1.9 km long in northwest–southeast direction and 1.3 km wide, rising to 697 m at the northwest coast of Larsen Inlet on Nordenskjöld Coast in Graham Land, Antarctica.

The feature is named after Iliya Maslarov, cook at St. Kliment Ohridski base during the 1993/94 summer season, member of the team that repaired and inaugurated the base facilities, and set the practice of annual national Antarctic campaigns.

Location

Maps
 Antarctic Digital Database (ADD). Scale 1:250000 topographic map of Antarctica. Scientific Committee on Antarctic Research (SCAR). Since 1993, regularly upgraded and updated

Notes

References
 Maslarov Nunatak. SCAR Composite Gazetteer of Antarctica
 Bulgarian Antarctic Gazetteer. Antarctic Place-names Commission. (details in Bulgarian, basic data in English)

External links
 Maslarov Nunatak. Adjusted Copernix satellite image

Nunataks of Graham Land
Bulgaria and the Antarctic
Nordenskjöld Coast